The Maestro is an album by pianist Cedar Walton with guest vocalist Abbey Lincoln recorded in 1980 and released on the Muse label.

Reception

Allmusic awarded the album 4 stars calling it "A well-rounded and easily recommended set of advanced straightahead jazz."

Track listing 
 "The Maestro" (Cedar Walton) - 4:38
 "Rhythm-a-Ning" (Thelonious Monk) - 6:30
 "Not in Love" (Abbey Lincoln) - 3:30
 "Sabiá" (Antônio Carlos Jobim, Chico Buarque) - 6:22
 "In a Sentimental Mood" (Duke Ellington, Manny Kurtz, Irving Mills) - 6:50
 "Blue Monk" (Monk) - 4:49
 "Castles" (Lincoln) - 4:49
 "On the Trail" (Ferde Grofé) - 3:40

Personnel 
Cedar Walton - piano
Abbey Lincoln - vocals (tracks 1, 3, 5 & 7)
Bob Berg - tenor saxophone (tracks 1, 2 & 4-8)
David Williams - bass
Billy Higgins - drums

References 

Cedar Walton albums
1981 albums
Muse Records albums